

History 
Chulalongkorn University Centenary Park is a  park located on the campus of Chulalongkorn University in Bangkok, Thailand. It was completed in 2017 to honor the 100th anniversary of the university's founding. Designed by landscape architecture firm Landprocess, Centenary Park was designed to serve as a rainwater detention basin, partially inspired by the late King Bhumibol Adulyadej's monkey cheeks project. the park will be divided into an outdoor patio learning center, where various buildings will plant trees to become green buildings. beneficial in water softening. designed according to the concept of "urban forest", designed as an urban water-resistant area. Using the principle of constructing a retention pond A large detention pond at the entrance to each park, which is designed in the form of a low area of the project There are also areas for receiving water (rain garden) and underground drainage systems. It has multipurpose space and 200 parking spaces, with the largest green roof in Thailand. 

The origin of the project comes from the initiatives of university administrators in the long-established master chart. which determined that the core of Chulalongkorn University's layout that connects to the commercial area is a green area The Property Management Office of Chulalongkorn University held a park design contest to celebrate the university's 100th anniversary. The winner of the main landscape architecture contest was Kotchakorn Woraakhom from the Land Process Design Company and the building designer from the N7A design office. The area of the park was originally a commercial building, which had expired its lease agreement with the university. and the university did not renew the contract.

Chulalongkorn University Centenary Park, Selected for Outstanding Architectural Design (ASA AD Award) in 2018 by the Association of Siamese Architects under the Royal Patronage of His Majesty the King. This is the first time that an architecture award has been awarded to a park.

Events 
The park draws concert goers from all walks of life to enjoy superb orchestral performances for free because it is not only conveniently accessible by public transportation but also precisely constructed to enhance the sound of an orchestra. The concerts, which are held every Sunday in January and February, feature a wide range of music, including pop, Broadway, and movie medleys, as well as classical music and local Thai favorites.
The Concert in the Park is notable for the peaceful ambiance that permeates the greenery as music drifts among the relaxed audience members who are dispersed throughout, many of whom are picnicking. Families and groups of friends converse while eating and drinking in groups on the grassy lawn. It's not unusual to see toddlers running about grannies while they wait for the music to start, laughing. Unable to ignore the songs, passing runners either pause to listen or shuffle along to the beat. And here is a list of every annual event.

 2018
 September - CUCA RUN 2018
 2019
 March - งานมรดกล้านนา ขันโตกจุฬาฯ ครั้งที่ ๓๘, ปั่นจักรยาน สานตำนานย่านรองเมือง ครั้งที่3, U-Center 1stRUN เดิน-วิ่ง นิสิตหอพักพวงชมพู ครั้งที่ 1: CU’s 102nd Anniversary
 April - Music in the garden, ปั่นจักรยาน สานตำนานย่านรองเมือง ครั้งที่4
 August - ปั่นจักรยาน สานตำนานย่านรองเมือง
 September - คนบันดาลไฟ, Learn to Run วิ่งยังไงให้ได้เรื่อง
 October - Nora dance
 November - European Union Film Festival 2019, Run To Spark, Mindful Mediation Walk & Run
 December - Concert in the Park, Aetas Fun Run
 2022
 January - Chula Art Park
 February - Concert in the Park, Magingan (มากินกัญ), ความงามของโอกาส
 April - สามย่านละลานใจ
 June - Village Tourism Festival 2022
 July - Love is all you need
 September - Chula Sustainability Fest 2022, Music in the park, Clothes and Books Swap Party
 October - Bangkok Music in the Park @ อุทยาน ๑๐๐ ปี จุฬาฯ

Usable area 
The park's area consists of a water catchment area. artificial wetlands, seepage gardens, and water-retardant ponds to slow down rainwater before it is released to the public. Monkey cheek seepage area and multipurpose building Within the park, there is a Chula 100-Year Road, 30 meters wide and 1.35 kilometers long, planting trees on both sides of the road, connecting the Chula 100-Year National Park area with Rama I Road and Rama IV Road.

 Constructed  Wetland - or wetlands separated into two long, parallel sides. To mirror the nature of the water flowing from high to low, the center of the garden makes use of the sloping area's characteristics. to pass through the water-resistant plants and coastal plants that can absorb pollutants and help the environment get back to normal. wastewater from structures in the project area and surrounding areas (phytoremediation). It establishes an ecosystem and completely circulates the water in the construction site before releasing it into the front Retention Pond.
 Detention Lawn - or a dry retaining area during a downpour On weekdays, the big lawn rapidly absorbs rain, deflects it away from the region, and allows it to gently soak into the earth. The children from nearby areas can play on one side. Children can play on a sloped slide that follows the contours of the earth. For sitting, conversing, unwinding, or participating in group activities, the opposite side is divided into steps that encircle the entire field like a tiny amphitheater.
 Green Roof - like a roof garden The landscape architect team has effectively transitioned a continuous green area from the bottom to the top from the raised area. Using a common tilt ratio and a big scale The level difference may not be noticeable to the naked eye. This roof garden not only fills the big concrete plot with greenery, but it also does a great job of lowering the temperature inside the building next to it. The majority of the plants chosen are weed plants. The seeds can reproduce by themselves once they are buried in the ground. It also requires little maintenance and can withstand drought well. The weeds that emerge from the mixture develop into a straightforward beauty that doesn't need much upkeep. It also develops beauty according to the changing seasons.
 Rain Garden - or rainwater gardens are pipe-less drainage systems. Instead, utilize the little mulches and plants that flank the route to absorb any remaining water. in addition to selecting a porous concrete floor (Porous Concrete) to aid with alternative water drainage.
 Retention Pond - It is a sizable swimming pool in front of the project, or wet area. It is also used to water the plants throughout the entire project. To accommodate the water that flows together and delay the water till it is waiting to be discharged to the outside area again. Exercise equipment made from water treatment equipment is placed near the poolside. Along with cycling and exercise, "Kangkhan Chaipattana" also oxygenates the pool's water.

Transportation 
BTS: get off at National Stadium Station. Then go straight to the exit, Gate 2, Supachalasai Stadium. Go to Soi Chula 12, then go straight and turn left into Soi Chula 9. Walk a little more, where the park is opposite the I'm Park project.

MRT: Get off at Sam Yan Station, walk to Soi Chula 42 and turn left into Soi. Then keep walking straight into Soi Chula 9 and keep walking. You will find the Chula 100 Year Park.

BUS: (Bus) No. 21, 40 (ปอ.) (AC), 507 (ปอ.) (AC), 67, 73 (ปอ.) (AC)

Private cars: the Chulalongkorn 100 Year Park has parking available.

Nature classroom 
Bamboo room - There is a chamber made of wood like black bamboo and a courtyard that is ideal for Tai Chi exercises. One of the many goods and gadgets used in daily life that tell the story of the bamboo groves. The genuine trunk, however, might not have been seen by the younger generation before they come to see it here.

Earth room - The wood in the room is similar to Samed Daeng, a multicolored step made in Thailand from a variety of soil sources. Compacted to a hard layer of earth that is suited for learning that corresponds to the tiers of an amphitheater.

Forest room - Similar to Pip, there is a wooden room that divides the room into a circle-shaped gathering area by raising and lowering the floor level. under the protection of the Pip Hom tree, prepared to learn.

Gravel room - There is a chamber like Daeng's wood, a unique space that gathers various kinds of wood used to manufacture furniture. which are ideal for small groups of users and which may be raised in Thailand, such as Mai Daeng and Makha, are separated into three stages.

Herb room - There is a nutmeg-like room tree. A variety of therapeutic plants have gathered in this area. which has many features and advantages. Until recently, there was essentially no need to rely on modern medications like Cha-Plu and aloe vera.

Sand room - There is a Tabak-like wooden room close to the entryway. to assist young people who will visit and play in this park The EPDM synthetic rubber floor has a soft, flexible surface and is protected for safety. Suitable for jogging and playing in sand pits with vibrant colors to encourage learning.

Stone room - There is a tree in the room that is similar to Kham Nang, highlighting the need of growing tall, upright perennials. Space can be employed freely in order to make the area below appear spacious.

Vine room - In addition to being utilized as a place to sit and unwind, the room has wood like Makha Mong, which is notable for having a pavilion arch. This pavilion is prepared to change in the future into a beautiful natural pavilion covered in many varieties of ivy plants.

Location 
Chulalongkorn University, Soi Chulalongkorn 5, Wang Mai Subdistrict, Pathum Wan District, Bangkok 10330. Soi Chulalongkorn 5, between Soi Chulalongkorn 9 and Banthat Thong Road.

References 

Property Management of Chulalongkorn University
Parks in Bangkok
Pathum Wan district